Clavicular facet of scapula is small oval facet on the medial border of the acromion for articulation with the acromial facet on the lateral end of the clavicle. Also called Clavicular articular facet of acromion.

The coracoacromial ligament is attached near the clavicular facet.

Additional images

Code
 TA code - A02.4.01.010
 FMA identifier - FMA 63568

See also

 Acromion
 Clavicle
 Acromioclavicular joint
 Acromioclavicular ligament
 Separated shoulder

References

Scapula